Paçoca is a candy made out of ground peanuts, sugar and salt. Some recipes also add flour, such as corn flour, oat flour or cassava flour. It is typical of the Brazilian Caipira cuisine and most present in the countryside of southeastern states of São Paulo and Minas Gerais, being either manufactured or home-made. It is also very common during the Festa Junina, an annual festivity that celebrates the caipira lifestyle. It is known for its distinct dry texture and sweet taste, and is one of the most beloved Brazilian candies.

Origins 
Paçoca in its present form was invented during the Colonial Brazil Period, but Native Brazilian peoples had recipes that mixed cassava flour with other ingredients prior to colonization. Those recipes were modified by the settlers, creating the current combination that uses sugar.

Name and relationship to the savory dish 
The name "paçoca" comes from the Tupi word "posok" (pronounced /pɔsɔk/) which means "to crumble" or "to shatter," and is shared with the salty Paçoca dish. Both are a mix of cassava flour with other ingredients: peanut and sugar in the case of the sweet, and carne-de-sol (sun-dried-beef) for the salty dish. Both dishes seem to have originated from the same Native Brazilian customs, but have grown to be completely different products.

Production 
The traditional artisanal process of making paçoca involves first roasting the peanuts, then grinding all the ingredients together using a traditional mortar (pilão). In more modern manufacturing techniques, instead of a mortar, industrial blenders are used, and the Paçocas are later pressed into many shapes, most commonly square or cork shapes.

Variations 
Some companies have created variations from the traditional Paçoca recipe, which include a diet version, with no sugar added, and a version with a concentration of peanuts.

See also
 List of Brazilian sweets and desserts

References 

Brazilian confectionery
Candy
Portuguese words and phrases
Indigenous cuisine of the Americas